This list of mountains and hills in Rhineland-Palatinate shows a selection of high and/or well-known mountains and hills in the German state of Rhineland-Palatinate (in order of height). Although there is no universally agreed definition, this list treats a mountain as an elevation of 2000 feet (612 m) or higher.

Highest points of the Rhineland-Palatinate regions 
The following table shows the highest mountains and hills of the Rhineland-Palatinate regions.

In the "Region" column, extensive or high ranges are shown in bold; whilst landscapes which either have no obvious high point or are lowlands with prominent hills (sometimes island-like) are shown in italics. Clicking on the word "List" (in the "Lists" column), links to further lists of mountains and hills in the particular region or landscape indicated (sometimes outside Rhineland-Palatinate). 

The table, which is arranged in order of height, may be sorted by clicking on the symbol at the head of the relevant column.

Mountains 
Name, Height in metres above  sea level (NN), Location (district/region). Three ??? mean unknown or not yet researched; please add information!

 Erbeskopf (816 m), Bernkastel-Wittlich district, Schwarzwälder Hochwald, Hunsrück
 An den zwei Steinen (766 m), Bernkastel-Wittlich district, Idar Forest, Hunsrück
 Kahlheid (766 m), Bernkastel-Wittlich district, Idar Forest, Hunsrück
 Steingerüttelkopf (757 m), Birkenfeld district, Idar Forest, Hunsrück
 Sandkopf (756 m), Trier-Saarburg district, Schwarzwälder Hochwald, Hunsrück
 Ruppelstein (755 m), Birkenfeld district, Schwarzwälder Hochwald, Hunsrück
 Hohe Acht (747 m), Ahrweiler district, High Eifel, Eifel
 Idarkopf (746 m), Birkenfeld district, Idar Forest, Hunsrück
 Usarkopf (724 m), Birkenfeld district, Idar Forest, Hunsrück
 Butterhecker Steinköpfe (723 m), Birkenfeld district, Schwarzwälder Hochwald, Hunsrück
 Ringelkopf (712 m), Birkenfeld district, Schwarzwälder Hochwald, Hunsrück
 Rösterkopf (708 m), Trier-Saarburg district, Osburger Hochwald, Hunsrück
 Friedrichskopf (707 m), Birkenfeld district, Dollberge/Schwarzwälder Hochwald, Hunsrück
 Ernstberg (Erresberg) (698.8 m), Vulkaneifel district, High Eifel, Eifel
 Schwarzer Mann (697.3 m), Bitburg-Prüm Eifel district, Schneifel, Eifel
 Teufelskopf (695 m), Trier-Saarburg district, Irrwald/Schwarzwälder Hochwald, Hunsrück
 Schimmelkopf (694.8 m), Merzig-Wadern district, Irrwald/Schwarzwälder Hochwald, Hunsrück
 Mückenbornberg (691 m), Trier-Saarburg district, Irrwald/Schwarzwälder Hochwald, Hunsrück
 Scharteberg (691 m), Vulkaneifel district, High Eifel, Eifel
 Donnersberg (687 m), Donnersbergkreis, North Palatine Uplands
 Prümscheid (675 m), Vulkaneifel district, High Eifel, Eifel
 Wildenburger Kopf (674 m), Birkenfeld district, Schwarzwälder Hochwald, Hunsrück
 Kalmit (673 m), Südliche Weinstraße district, Haardt, Palatine Forest
 Hohe Wurzel (669 m), Trier-Saarburg district, Osburg High Forest, Hunsrück
 Schöneberg (668 m), Ahrweiler district, Schneifel, Eifel
 Wehlenstein (668 m), Birkenfeld district, Schwarzwälder Hochwald, Hunsrück
 Sandkopf (665 m), Birkenfeld district, Schwarzwälder Hochwald, Hunsrück
 Kesselberg (663 m), Südliche Weinstraße district, Haardt, Palatine Forest
 Seimersberg (663 m), Bitburg-Prüm Eifel district, Schneifel, Eifel
 Ellerspring (657 m), Bad Kreuznach  district, Soonwald, Hunsrück
 Fuchskaute (657 m), Westerwald district, High Westerwald, Westerwald
 Stegskopf (654.4 m), Altenkirchen district, Westerwald
 Salzburger Kopf (654.2 m), Westerwaldkreis, Westerwald
 Simmerkopf (653 m), Rhein-Hunsrück district, Soonwald, Hunsrück
 Ringkopf (650 m), Birkenfeld district, Schwarzwälder Hochwald, Hunsrück
 Opel (649 m), Bad Kreuznach district and Landkreis Rhein-Hunsrück district, Soonwald, Hunsrück
 Hochsteinchen (648 m), Rhein-Hunsrück district, Soonwald, Hunsrück
 Nerother Kopf (647 m), Vulkaneifel district, High Eifel, Eifel
 Mörschieder Burr] (646 m), Birkenfeld district, Schwarzwälder Hochwald, Hunsrück
 Prümer Kopf (646 m), Bitburg-Prüm Eifel district, Schneifel, Eifel
 Schanzerkopf (643 m), Rhein-Hunsrück district, Soonwald, Hunsrück
 Kühlfelder Stein (638 m), ??? district, Westerwald
 Esselsberg (637 m), ??? district, High Eifel, Eifel
 Kandrich (637 m), Mainz-Bingen district, Bingen Forest, Hunsrück
 Katzenkopf (637 m), Rhein-Hunsrück district, Soonwald, Hunsrück
 Roßberg (637 m), Südliche Weinstraße district, Haardt, Palatine Forest
 Hochberg (636 m), Südliche Weinstraße district, Haardt, Palatine Forest
 Ochsenbaumer Höhe (632 m), Rhein-Hunsrück district, Soonwald, Hunsrück
 Salzkopf (628 m), Mainz-Bingen district, Bingen Forest, Hunsrück
 Aremberg (623.0 m), Ahrweiler district, Ahr Hills, Eifel
 Silberich (623 m), Birkenfeld district, Schwarzwälder Hochwald, Hunsrück
 Alteburg (621 m), Bad Kreuznach  district, Soonwald, Hunsrück
 Vorkastell (620 m), ??? district, Dollberge/Schwarzwälder Hochwald, Hunsrück
 Hohe Loog (619 m), town of Neustadt an der Weinstraße, Haardt, Palatine Forest
 Franzosenkopf (618 m), Mainz-Bingen district, Bingen Forest, Hunsrück
 Blättersberg with the Ludwig Tower (617.5 m), Südliche Weinstraße district, Haardt, Palatine Forest
 Schafkopf (617 m), Südliche Weinstraße district, Palatine Forest
 Höchstberg (616 m), ??? district, Vulkaneifel, Eifel
 Auf der Wurst (615 m), ??? district, Schneifel, Eifel
 Alsberg (613 m), Westerwald district, Westerwald
 Steigerkopf (also: Schänzel) with the Schänzel Tower (613 m), Südliche Weinstraße district, Palatine Forest

Hills 
 Dreiser Höhe (611 m), ??? district, High Eifel, Eifel
 Blattersberg (609 m), Südliche Weinstraße district, Palatine Forest
 Eschkopf (609 m), Südwestpfalz district, Palatine Forest
 Mosisberg (609 m), Südwestpfalz district, Palatine Forest
 Morschenberg (608 m), Südliche Weinstraße district, Haardt, Palatine Forest
 Rothsohlberg (607 m), Südliche Weinstraße district, Haardt, Palatine Forest
 Steffelnkopf (607 m), ??? district, Schneifel, Eifel
 Weißenberg (607 m), Südwestpfalz district, Palatine Forest
 Hortenkopf (606 m), Südwestpfalz district, Palatine Forest
 Taubenkopf (604 m), town of Neustadt an der Weinstraße, Haardt, Palatine Forest
 Heimerich (601 m), ??? district, Westerwald
 Teufelsberg (598 m), Südliche Weinstraße district, Haardt, Palatine Forest
 Hardtkopf (597 m), Bitburg-Prüm Eifel district, South Eifel, Eifel
 Womrather Höhe (597 m), Rhein-Hunsrück district, Lützelsoon, Hunsrück
 Hochsimmer (587.9 m), Mayen-Koblenz district, High Eifel
 Herzerberg (585 m), Kusel district, North Palatine Uplands
 Orensberg (581 m), Südliche Weinstraße district, Haardt, Palatine Forest
 Rehberg (576.8 m), Südliche Weinstraße district, Wasgau, Palatine Forest
 Stolzberg (572 m), Kusel district, North Palatine Uplands
 Schindhübel (571 m), Bad Dürkheim district, Palatine Forest
 Drachenfels (570.8 m), Bad Dürkheim district, Palatine Forest
 Bloskülb (570 m), Bad Dürkheim district, Palatine Forest
 Großer Adelberg (569 m), Südliche Weinstraße district, Palatine Forest
 Brogberg (567 m), Bad Dürkheim district, Palatine Forest
 Hoher Stoppelkopf (567 m), Bad Dürkheim district, Palatine Forest
 Königsberg (567 m), Kusel district, North Palatine Uplands
 Almersberg (564 m), Südliche Weinstraße district, Palatine Forest
 Potzberg (562 m), Kusel district, North Palatine Uplands
 Steinberger Ley] (558 m), ??? district, Vulkaneifel, Eifel
 Hohenberg (556 m), Südliche Weinstraße district, Haardt, Palatine Forest
 Rockeskyller Kopf (555 m), Vulkan Eifel district, Vulkaneifel
 Weinbiet (553 m), town of Neustadt an der Weinstraße, Haardt, Palatine Forest
 Koppensteiner Höhe (551 m), Rhein-Hunsrück district, Soonwald, Hunsrück
 Hoher List (549 m), Vulkan Eifel district, Vulkaneifel, Eifel
 Selberg (546 m), Kusel district, North Palatine Uplands
 Montabaurer Höhe (545 m), Westerwald district, Westerwald
 Köppel (540 m), Westerwald district, Westerwald
 Herrmannsberg (536 m), Kusel district, North Palatine Uplands
 Bobenthaler Knopf (534 m), Südwestpfalz district, Palatine Forest
 Hohenseelbachskopf (530 m),??? district, Westerwald
 Bornberg (Palatinate) (520 m), Kusel district, North Palatine Uplands
 Rahnfels (517 m), Bad Dürkheim district, Haardt, Palatine Forest
 Eckkopf (516 m), Bad Dürkheim district, Palatine Forest
 Großer Eyberg (513 m), Südwestpfalz district, Palatine Forest
 Hochthürmerberg (499.8 m), Euskirchen district, Ahr Hills
 Stabenberg (496 m), town of Neustadt an der Weinstraße, Haardt, Palatine Forest
 Goßberg (Hunsrück) (494 m), Rhein-Hunsrück district
 Peterskopf (487 m), Bad Dürkheim district, Haardt, Palatine Forest
 Weilerskopf (470 m), Bad Dürkheim district, Haardt, Palatine Forest
 Asberg (441 m), Neuwied district, Unkel
 Spitzkopf (429 m), Bad Dürkheim district, Palatine Forest
 Dernbacher Kopf (427 m), Neuwied district, Dernbach (near Dierdorf)
 Meerberg (422 m), Neuwied district, Linz
 Lemberg (422 m), Bad Kreuznach  district, Naheland
 Hochberg (421 m), Südwestpfalz district, Wasgau, Palatine Forest
 Heidenberg with the Buchkammerfels (420 m), Südwestpfalz district, Wasgau, Palatine Forest
 Minderberg (417 m), Neuwied district, Linz
 Heiße Bäumchen (410 m), Bad Ems district, Dachsenhausen
 Mainzer Berg (Palatinate) (403 m), Bad Dürkheim district, Palatine Forest
 Wetterkreuzberg (400.7 m), Südliche Weinstraße district, Palatine Forest
 Beulskopf (388 m), Altenkirchen district, Westerwald
 Kühkopf (382 m), town of Koblenz, Hunsrück
 Remigiusberg (368 m), Kusel district, North Palatine Uplands
 Liescher Berg (347 m), Trier-Saarburg district, Saargau
 Teufelsstein (317 m), Bad Dürkheim district, Haardt, Palatine Forest
 Mont Royal (305 m), Bernkastel-Wittlich district, Kondelwald
 Kleine Kalmit (270 m), Südliche Weinstraße district/Landau in der Palatinate
 Zotzenheimer Horn with the Napoleonshöhe (270 m), Mainz-Bingen district
 Petersberg (246 m), Alzey-Worms district, Rheinhessen
 Ehrenbreitstein (118 m), town of Koblenz

See also 
 List of the highest mountains in Germany
 List of the highest mountains in the German states
 List of mountain and hill ranges in Germany

References

 
Rhineland-Palatinate
Mou